Rory Jennings (born 20 July 1983) is a British actor, radio personality for Talksport, and poker player. He played Craig Dixon in the BBC soap opera EastEnders appearing on screen between 27 July and 7 September 2007.

Early life 
Jennings was born in London, England. He has been acting since the age of ten. As a child actor he trained at the Sylvia Young Theatre School; he took a break from acting in 2001 to study Politics at the University of Liverpool.

Acting Career

Theatre

Television

Film

Music Videos

Commercials
'The People's Post Office' advert for the Post Office, directed by Armando Iannucci.

References

External links

1983 births
Living people
English male soap opera actors
Alumni of the Sylvia Young Theatre School
Male actors from London
Alumni of the University of Liverpool